Department of Revolutionary Orientation (DOR) is a division of the Central Committee of the Communist Party of Cuba.

See also
 Committees for the Defense of the Revolution

References

Communist Party of Cuba
Censorship in Cuba